Unificationist may refer to:

 Unificationist (religion), A member of the Unification Church; not to be confused with Unitarians or Unitarian Universalists
 In politics of Australia, a unificationist is a person who favours abolition of the federal system and the unification of the states

See also
Unionist (disambiguation)